New Lexington is a village in and the county seat of Perry County, Ohio, United States,  southwest of Zanesville and  miles southeast of Columbus. The population was 4,731 at the 2010 census.

In 2020, New Lexington’s historical Main Street underwent a massive renovation project that delivered new brick sidewalks, trash cans, benches, trees, and decorative street lighting. The project cost $2.1 million and was made possible through the Streetscape Grant. 

In 1900, 1,701 people lived in New Lexington, Ohio; in 1910, 2,559 lived here.

History
New Lexington was laid out in 1817. The village was named after Lexington, Massachusetts. A post office called New Lexington has been in operation since 1829. The Perry County Courthouse that stands at the corner of Main Street and West Brown Street was erected in 1887 and was dedicated one year later.

Geography
New Lexington is located at  (39.715913, -82.210452).

Climate

Demographics

2010 census
As of the census of 2010, there were 4,731 people, 1,838 households, and 1,164 families living in the village. The racial makeup of the village was 97.9% White, 0.5% African American, 0.2% Native American, 0.1% Asian, 0.1% Pacific Islander, 0.1% from other races, and 1.1% from two or more races. Hispanic or Latino of any race were 0.6% of the population.

There were 1,838 households, of which 36.3% had children under the age of 18 living with them, 39.9% were married couples living together, 17.8% had a female householder with no husband present, 5.6% had a male householder with no wife present, and 36.7% were non-families. 30.6% of all households were made up of individuals, and 11.1% had someone living alone who was 65 years of age or older. The average household size was 2.53 and the average family size was 3.12.

The median age in the village was 33.8 years. 28.2% of residents were under the age of 18; 9.1% were between the ages of 18 and 24; 26.3% were from 25 to 44; 23.3% were from 45 to 64; and 13.3% were 65 years of age or older. The gender makeup of the village was 47.3% male and 52.7% female.

2000 census
As of the census of 2000, there were 4,689 people, 1,836 households, and 1,233 families living in the village. The population density was 2,017.1 people per square mile (780.4/km2). There were 1,976 housing units at an average density of 850.0 per square mile (328.9/km2). The racial makeup of the village was 98.76% White, 0.17% African American, 0.23% Native American, 0.13% Asian, 0.04% Pacific Islander, 0.13% from other races, and 0.53% from two or more races. Hispanic or Latino of any race were 0.38% of the population.

There were 1,836 households, out of which 35.2% had children under the age of 18 living with them, 48.5% were married couples living together, 13.5% had a female householder with no husband present, and 32.8% were non-families. 28.6% of all households were made up of individuals, and 12.9% had someone living alone who was 65 years of age or older. The average household size was 2.50 and the average family size was 3.07.

In the village, the population was spread out, with 28.1% under the age of 18, 10.4% from 18 to 24, 26.6% from 25 to 44, 19.5% from 45 to 64, and 15.5% who were 65 years of age or older. The median age was 33 years. For every 100 females there were 91.3 males. For every 100 females age 18 and over, there were 85.9 males.

The median income for a household in the village was $28,406, and the median income for a family was $33,514. Males had a median income of $28,155 versus $21,039 for females. The per capita income for the village was $14,127. About 16.4% of families and 17.6% of the population were below the poverty line, including 27.0% of those under age 18 and 11.2% of those age 65 or over.

Government
In 2023, the mayor of New Lexington is Trent Thompson.

Education
New Lexington City School District operates New Lexington Elementary, Junction City Elementary, New Lexington Middle School, and New Lexington High School.

New Lexington has a public library, a branch of the Perry County District Library.

In popular culture
Part of the film Brubaker was filmed in New Lexington.

Notable people
 William A. Calderhead, U.S. Representative from Kansas.
 James M. Comly,  brigadier general in Union Army, journalist, attorney, newspaper editor and owner, historian and diplomat.
 Dan Dodd, member of the Ohio House of Representatives.
 Stephen Benton Elkins, industrialist and politician.
 William C. Grimes, acting Governor of Oklahoma Territory.
 Januarius MacGahan, journalist and national hero of Bulgaria.
 Jerry McGee - professional golfer.
 John A. McShane, first Democrat elected to United States House of Representatives from Nebraska.
 Albert Francis Zahm - specialist in aerodynamics; early aircraft experimenter
 John Augustine Zahm - Holy Cross priest and scientist.

References

External links
 Village of New Lexington
 New Lexington City Schools

 
County seats in Ohio
Villages in Perry County, Ohio
Villages in Ohio
1817 establishments in Ohio
Populated places established in 1817